The Vanderbilt-Ingram Cancer Center is an NCI-designated Comprehensive Cancer Center in Nashville, TN. It is part of the Vanderbilt University Medical Center.

The Vanderbilt Cancer Center was established in 1993 and received its initial NCI designation in 1995. It was renamed the Vanderbilt-Ingram Cancer Center in 1999 after a significant donation from the Ingram family. The center received its NCI "comprehensive" cancer center status in 2001. VICC has more than 280 faculty members involved in the research and treatment of cancer. The center receives more than $140 million annually in federal research funding, landing it among the top ten in the nation for federal research grants.

VICC is also a member of the National Comprehensive Cancer Network.

VICC sponsors a number of clinical trials.

References 

NCI-designated cancer centers
Vanderbilt University
1993 establishments in Tennessee